Mark Firman Bear is an American neuroscientist. He is currently the Picower Professor of Neuroscience at The Picower Institute for Learning and Memory at Massachusetts Institute of Technology. He is a former Howard Hughes Medical Institute Investigator; an Elected Fellow of the American Association for the Advancement of Science and the American Academy of Arts and Sciences; and a Member of the National Academy of Medicine.

Education 
Bear earned a B.S. degree from Duke University and his Ph.D. in neurobiology at Brown University.

Career 
Until 2003, Bear was the Sidney A. and Dorothy Doctors Fox Professor at Brown University's Alpert Medical School. He was appointed Picower Professor of Neuroscience at The Picower Institute for Learning and Memory in the Department of Brain and Cognitive Sciences at MIT in 2003, and served as Director of The Picower Institute from 2007 to 2009.

Bear's research focuses on understanding developmental plasticity in the visual cortex and experience-dependent synaptic modification in visual cortex and hippocampus. He has described novel forms of procedural learning in the visual system, and investigated synaptic function in models of fragile X syndrome and other autism spectrum disorders

Selected publications
 Bear, Mark F., Barry W. Connors, and Michael A. Paradiso, eds. Neuroscience. Vol. 2. Lippincott Williams & Wilkins, 2007.
 Malenka, Robert C., and Mark F. Bear. "LTP and LTD: an embarrassment of riches." Neuron 44.1 (2004): 5-21.
 Bear, Mark F., Kimberly M. Huber, and Stephen T. Warren. "The mGluR theory of fragile X mental retardation." Trends in neurosciences 27.7 (2004): 370–377.
 Abraham, Wickliffe C., and Mark F. Bear. "Metaplasticity: the plasticity of synaptic plasticity." Trends in neurosciences 19.4 (1996): 126–130.
 Bear, Mark F., and Robert C. Malenka. "Synaptic plasticity: LTP and LTD." Current Opinion in Neurobiology 4.3 (1994): 389–399.
 Dudek, Serena M., and Mark F. Bear. "Homosynaptic long-term depression in area CA1 of hippocampus and effects of N-methyl-D-aspartate receptor blockade." Proceedings of the National Academy of Sciences 89.10 (1992): 4363–4367.
 Bear, Mark F., and Wolf Singer. "Modulation of visual cortical plasticity by acetylcholine and noradrenaline." (1986): 172–176.

References

External links 

 

Year of birth missing (living people)
Living people
Massachusetts Institute of Technology School of Science faculty
American neuroscientists
Duke University alumni
Brown University alumni
Fellows of the American Academy of Arts and Sciences
Fellows of the American Association for the Advancement of Science
Members of the National Academy of Medicine